Perišić is a Bosnian, Croatian, Montenegrin and Serbian surname. Notable people with the surname include:

Dragan Perišić (born 1979), Serbian footballer
Goran Perišić (born 1976), Montenegrin footballer
Ivan Perišić (born 1989), Croatian footballer
Miodrag Perišić (1948–2003), Serbian politician
Momčilo Perišić (born 1944), Serbian general
Radmila Perišić (born 1980), Serbian judoka
Risto Perišić, commander of police in Bosnia and Herzegovina during the Bosnian War

Croatian surnames
Serbian surnames
Slavic-language surnames
Patronymic surnames